Dalija Orešković (born 18 June 1977) is a Croatian lawyer and politician. She served as the president of the Conflict of Interest Commission from 2013 to 2018. She was the leader of the centre-left START, founded in 2019. She stepped down from the position of party leader in 2020, when the party changed its name to Party with a First and Last Name (STRIP). In 2020 parliamentary elections she was elected for member of Croatian Parliament. In November 2020, the party merged with the Pametno to form the Centre.

Education 
Orešković studied law at the University of Zagreb and finished a post-graduate study in European Law.

Conflict of Interest Commission 
From 2013 to 2018 Orešković served as President of the Conflict of Interest Commission after being chosen by the parliament, beating 198 other candidates. She initiated proceedings against MPs, mayors, ministers and the president. She is often credited for the fall of Tomislav Karamarko, former deputy prime minister and former president of HDZ. Nataša Novaković succeeded her on the position.

Political career 
In October 2018 she announced she would enter politics on the centre spectrum. On December 29, 2018 she announced her party will be called START, standing for "Party of Anti-corruption, Development and Transparency". She ran for president in 2019, obtaining 55,163 or 2.9% of the votes, coming in 6th out of 11 candidates, and being eliminated in the first round.

In May 2020, the START changed its name to Party with a First and Last Name (STRIP), and Orešković stepped down from the position of party president. In the parliamentary elections held on 05 July 2020, she was elected for member of Croatian Parliament. In November 2020, the party merged with the Pametno to form a single party, called the Centre.

Personal life 
Orešković's family originates from Lika. She is a descendant of a Croatian Partisan commander and People's Hero of Yugoslavia, Marko Orešković.

She was married to Frane Letica, son of Slaven Letica, and they have two daughters.

References

1977 births
Living people
Candidates for President of Croatia
Lawyers from Zagreb
Politicians from Zagreb
Faculty of Law, University of Zagreb alumni
Representatives in the modern Croatian Parliament